Anđelović (also spelled Andjelović) is a Serbian surname, which may refer to:

Anđelović noble family, a branch of the Byzantine Angeloi
Mihailo Anđelović
Mahmud Pasha Anđelović
Branislav Anđelović, guitarist in Rokeri s Moravu

See also
Anđelić
Anđelković
Aranđelović

Serbian surnames